Evgenij Spiridonov or Eugen Spiridonov (born ) is a German male artistic gymnast and part of the national team.  He participated at the 2008 Summer Olympics. He also competed at world championships including the 2011 World Artistic Gymnastics Championships in Tokyo, Japan.

References

1982 births
Living people
German male artistic gymnasts
Medalists at the World Artistic Gymnastics Championships
Place of birth missing (living people)
Gymnasts at the 2008 Summer Olympics
Olympic gymnasts of Germany
European champions in gymnastics
20th-century German people
21st-century German people